Andrew Mesourouni (born 19 December 2000), is an Australian professional footballer who plays as a attacking midfielder for Lleida Esportiu.

References

External links

Living people
2000 births
Australian soccer players
Association football midfielders
South Melbourne FC players
PAS Lamia 1964 players
PAE Kerkyra players
Lleida Esportiu footballers
Super League Greece 2 players
Australian expatriate soccer players
Expatriate footballers in Greece
Expatriate footballers in Spain
Australian expatriate sportspeople in Greece
Australian expatriate sportspeople in Spain
Soccer players from Melbourne
Australian people of Greek descent